United States gubernatorial elections were held in 1885, in seven states.

Mississippi and Virginia at this time held their gubernatorial elections in odd numbered years, every 4 years, following the United States presidential election year. New York at this time elected its governors to a three-year term. Massachusetts and Rhode Island both elected its governors to a single-year term, which they would abandon in 1920 and 1912, respectively. Iowa and Ohio at this time held gubernatorial elections in every odd numbered year.

In Ohio, the gubernatorial election was held in October for the last time; the next gubernatorial election would be held on the same day as federal elections.

Results

References

Bibliography 
 
 
 
 

 
November 1885 events